John Cannon Few (born April 9, 1963) is a justice of the South Carolina Supreme Court, elected on February 3, 2016, and sworn in on February 9, 2016, to fill the position vacated by Costa M. Pleicones on his ascension to Chief Justice (retiring chief justice Jean H. Toal left the court).  Few is a graduate of Duke University, where he served as the athletic mascot, and the University of South Carolina School of Law, where he was a member of The Order of Wig and Robe and The Order of the Coif. He also served as Student Works Editor of the South Carolina Law Review.

Few began his legal career as law clerk to The Honorable G. Ross Anderson, United States District Judge. He then went on to private practice, which he left in 2000 to serve as a trial judge on the Circuit Court of South Carolina. Few became Chief Judge of the South Carolina Court of Appeals in 2010, departing that position to join the South Carolina Supreme Court in 2016.

References

Sources 
Justice John C. Few - South Carolina SUPREME COURT
Chief Judge John C. Few South Carolina COURT OF APPEALS

Living people
1963 births
Duke University alumni
People from Anderson, South Carolina
Justices of the South Carolina Supreme Court
21st-century American judges
University of South Carolina alumni